Linda atricornis is a species of beetle in the family Cerambycidae. It was described by Maurice Pic in 1924. It is known from China.

References

atricornis
Beetles described in 1924